The following is a list of 2016 box office number-one films in France. Variety proclaimed that in 2016, France’s 2016 total box office was "the second-best in the last 50 years" and that after combining admissions for all films of any nationality, the total box office came in at 213 million, up 3.6% on 2015 and only bettered by 2011’s 217 million. The most popular films at the French box office were That Hollywood animation and action films and the latest new films in contemporary French comedy franchises.

References

2016
France
2016 in French cinema